Calophyllum morobense is a species of flowering plant in the Calophyllaceae family. It is found only in Papua New Guinea. It is threatened by habitat loss.

References

morobense
Endemic flora of Papua New Guinea
Endangered plants
Taxonomy articles created by Polbot
Taxobox binomials not recognized by IUCN